Casey Chin (born August 27, 1992) is a professional Canadian football linebacker who is currently a free agent. He was most recently with the BC Lions. He was drafted 27th overall in the 2014 CFL Draft by the Lions and signed with the club on May 27, 2014. He was ranked as the 12th best player in the Canadian Football League's Amateur Scouting Bureau final rankings for players eligible in the 2014 CFL Draft. He played college football with the Simon Fraser Clan. He went to École des Pionniers de Maillardville in Port Coquitlam for his Middle School and New Westminster Secondary for his High School.

References

External links
BC Lions bio

1992 births
Living people
BC Lions players
Canadian football linebackers
Edmonton Elks players
People from Port Moody
Players of Canadian football from British Columbia
Simon Fraser Clan football players